The Appaloosa (also known as Southwest to Sonora) is a 1966 American Western film starring Marlon Brando, Anjanette Comer, and John Saxon, who was nominated for a Golden Globe for Best Supporting Actor for his portrayal of a Mexican bandit. The film was directed by Sidney J. Furie, and shot in Techniscope in California, Utah, and Arizona.

Plot
Based on the 1963 book by Robert MacLeod, the title character is a beautiful horse (a breed, the Appaloosa) belonging to Matt Fletcher (Marlon Brando), a Mexican-American buffalo hunter who returns home, only to have his beloved horse stolen by a powerful bandit, Chuy Medina (John Saxon) with the help of the bandit's girlfriend, Trini (Anjanette Comer) in the border town of Ojo Prieto. Trini was sold to Chuy at the age of 15, but has been brutalized and effectively discarded.

Matt begins to hunt down the bandit to recapture the horse, but finds matters more complicated than expected when he meets the bandit's girlfriend. Fletcher is subjected to torture and humiliation by Chuy and his minions. A later foray into Medina's camp results in a brutal arm wrestling match in a bar between Fletcher and the bandido. Fletcher loses and is stung on the arm by a scorpion. Again left to die, Fletcher is rescued by Trini, who despises her "lover", Chuy, and prefers Fletcher's company. She gets him assistance from a kindly old peasant, which later costs the old man his life. During the violence-laden climax, Fletcher is forced to choose between Trini and his beloved Appaloosa. Matt, realizing that Trini means more to him than the horse, sends out the Appaloosa to draw Chuy's fire. As the bandit prepares to aim for the horse, sunlight glints on his gun barrel, revealing his position. Matt fires and kills him. Matt and Trini then cross the border with the Appaloosa to start a new life.

Cast
 Marlon Brando as Matt 
 Anjanette Comer as Trini
 John Saxon as Chuy
 Emilio Fernández as Lazaro
 Alex Montoya as Squint Eye
 Míriam Colón as Ana
 Rafael Campos as Paco
 Frank Silvera as Ramos
 Larry D. Mann as Priest

Production
The film was shot in shot in Wrightwood, Antelope Valley, and Lake Los Angeles, California; St. George, Utah; and Colorado City, Arizona. Parts of the film were also shot in Hurricane and at the Virgin River in Utah.

The film was John Saxon's favorite among his movies.

Awards
The film was awarded the Bronze Wrangler by the National Cowboy & Western Heritage Museum for outstanding Western motion picture of 1966.

See also
 List of American films of 1966

References

External links
 
 
 

1966 films
1960s English-language films
1966 Western (genre) films
Films about horses
Films directed by Sidney J. Furie
Films set in Mexico
Films based on American novels
Films based on Western (genre) novels
American Western (genre) films
Films set in the 1870s
Films shot in California
Universal Pictures films
Films shot in Arizona
Films shot in Utah
Films scored by Frank Skinner
1960s American films